South Korea has been a society that could not guarantee work–life balance historically and legally. But work–life balance in South Korea advanced when  emerged as a neologism, changing the perception of people's work and their basic rights. There are two major movements: improving law and improving people's perceptions.

Work life-balance in Korea 

 (워라밸), or work–life balance, is a newly coined Korean term that has emerged as the tendency to value quality of life rather than annual salary increases. Rather than getting a high salary from a good company, he feels happy to enjoy his life with proper working hours and salaries. Recently, the so-called "life with evening", which is described as "work and life balance", has become a basic human value. Warabel, which is favored by young people these days, has as much to gain as to lose. While you can get a communal life, such as family conversations, child care issues and family happiness, you have to give up much of your personal needs, such as salary and promotion at work. For an ideal world called Warabal to be realized, both welfare and basic income, the basic condition of human life, must be resolved.

Labor history of South Korea and the recognition process of Waravel 
Through economic development in the 1960s, Korean society shifted from an agricultural society to an industrial one. In the 1970s, export-oriented heavy and chemical industrialization achieved considerable growth. But this was a low-paying, long-time system, centered on labor-intensive industries. In other words, Warabal was not only not made in South Korean society, but it was also not recognized.

After Jeon Tae-il died in Cheonggye Plaza on November 13, 1970, shouting, "We are not machines" and "Follow the Labor Standards Act," the peace market was ordered to abide by the Labor Standards Act and the dream of forming a labor union was realized. The words 'we are not machines' prompted Jeon to reconsider who we are and think about the human rights of workers who are not protected by the law as well as workers. This incident was the beginning of South Korea's Warabal.

In today's Korean society, Warabal is a satisfactory state of life that properly distributes energy and time to work and daily life, drawing a lot of attention from office workers. But still in Korean society, Warabal is incomplete. This is a natural response that the Korean society, which has been struggling with growth, has come up with after suffering low growth and job insecurity. In fact, Korea ranked 36th in the OECD's "Better Life Index" in 2016, the lowest among 38 countries.

Recently, South Korea has been trying to raise awareness of Warabal. In 2018, mobile apps that can help Warabal have become popular in South Korea. According to a 2017 social survey released by the National Statistical Office last year, the highest percentage of respondents who were not satisfied with their leisure life after work was "economic burden." As a result, PT (Personal Translation) training app and foreign language 1:1 private tutoring service are gaining popularity recently. Also, classes to develop your hobbies and talents after work are becoming popular. In 2019, the South Korean company has recently released products that automatically shut down its computers at the end of working hours and allow people to conveniently report to and from work via mobile apps. It will allow employees to use work hours more flexibly and comply with the legal working hours of up to 52 hours.

South Korean laws and policies regarding labor 
These changes can also be confirmed in the 2017 social survey results The number of respondents who said families took precedence over work increased from 11.9 percent in 2015 to 13.9 percent in 2017, while those who said work was priority dropped from 53.7 percent in 2015 to 43.1 percent in 2017.

It is expected that the shorter working hours will improve the quality of life for workers with the aim of not only creating new jobs but also realizing Wara Valley, which means work-life balance. However, not everyone is welcoming the reduction of working hours, which values Warabal. Many companies are concerned about labor shortages, rising labor costs, worsening profitability and falling competitiveness due to shorter working hours.

But recently, companies have been conducting in-house campaigns to implement warabels. LS Mirae Institute each conducted "Family Happiness Camp – Camp with Dad," a two-day waravel program involving employees and primary and secondary school children. The Family Happiness Camp is a program where all family members, including fathers, mothers and children, participate in, coaching each other on childcare and education, writing letters to each other, making crafts, enhancing family intimacy and building harmony.

Work–life balance in South Korea (Warabal) is also closely related to various areas, such as women's jobs and child care. Women often have to quit their jobs if the work-life balance is not maintained. Therefore, policies for work-life balance include women's job policies and child care policies. As working mothers in Korea are suffering from child rearing and domestic labor while working, a vicious cycle of quitting their jobs or giving birth is taking place. According to the nation's women's participation in economic activities by age, with the exception of those under 0s and 60s and older, the employment rate of women in their 30s was the lowest at 60.1 percent, and the employment rate of women form M. Lowest in 30's and slowly recover. The reasons for career discontinuation are marriage (40.4%), pregnancy and childbirth (38.3%), family member Dol (12.9%), preschool child rearing (6.9%), and preschooler education (1.5%).

Labor Standards Act 
The main points of the revised Labor Standards Act of 2018 are as follows:

 Reduced from a maximum of 68 hours a week to 52 hours, including overtime and holiday work.
 Maximum working hours for workers younger than 18 are reduced from 40 hours per week to 35 hours per week.
 Making it mandatory for private companies to take paid holidays in legal holiday.
 Businesses with fewer than 30 employees are temporarily admitted to special extended work - in the case of using workers with less than 30 employees at all times, the working hours may be extended to a range not exceeding 8 hours per week in addition to the extended working hours, upon written agreement with the worker's representative.

Politicies for women 

 The pregnancy work hour reduction system: The new pregnancy work hour reduction system, established in 2014, is a system that requires users to allow female workers within 12 weeks of pregnancy or 36 weeks after their pregnancy to apply for two hours of work per day. Since March 2016, it has expanded to all workplaces regardless of the size of their businesses and has been in operation.
 maternity leave: When the Labor Standards Act was enacted in 1953, maternity leave was introduced as a 60-day leave system, and as the vacation period was extended from 60 days to 90 days in November 2001, the expanded 30-day pay was started to be shared and paid from employment insurance. The maternity leave is available to all pregnant female workers who work at all workplaces with one or more employees.

See also 
 Work–life balance in Germany
 Work–life balance in the United States

References 

Work–life balance
Society of South Korea